Le Bonhomme is a village and commune in the Haut-Rhin département of north-eastern France. It lies at the eastern foot of the Col du Bonhomme.

See also
 Communes of the Haut-Rhin department

References

Bonhomme